Safaq Al-Anzi (born 1943) is a Saudi Arabian sport shooter. He competed in the 1984 Summer Olympics.

References

1943 births
Living people
Shooters at the 1984 Summer Olympics
Saudi Arabian male sport shooters
Olympic shooters of Saudi Arabia